Monsters: Dark Continent (also known as Monsters 2: Dark Continent or simply Monsters 2) is a 2014 British science fiction monster film directed by Tom Green and co-written by Green and Jay Basu. It is the sequel to 2010's Monsters, directed by Gareth Edwards. Due to commitments with Godzilla, Edwards did not return to direct, but served as an executive producer. Filming began in March 2013, taking place in Jordan and Detroit (U.S.).

The film premiered at the BFI London Film Festival on 9 October 2014. Originally scheduled for a wide release on 28 November, the film was pushed back to 1 May 2015.

Plot
Ten years after the events of the previous film, identical extraterrestrial life forms to those spread throughout the Mexico–United States border region have appeared in the Middle East. After giving their goodbyes to various family members (and visiting a dog fight featuring an infant creature), four closely knit friends from Detroit—Michael, Frankie, Inkelaar and new father Williams—are U.S. Army soldiers deployed to the Middle East for their first tour as they must deal with the creatures (dubbed "monsters" by the military) and a new insurgency on the rise. They meet their team leaders, Forrest and Frater. Frater, who has already gone through nine tours, has become estranged from his wife and daughter, who he says is afraid of him. On their first mission, they investigate a farm house and interrogate the owner. During the encounter, one of the gigantic creatures wanders past the group and they gun it down. Three months into their tour, the team receives a search and rescue mission for four soldiers who have gone missing along a particularly active area.

During a drive, the team's convoy hits a hidden IED which disables both vehicles, killing Forrest and two of their team. Williams, disoriented by the explosion, wanders onto another IED, which detonates, blowing his legs off. The group is then set under fire by insurgents. Rushing Williams to safety, Inkelaar is unable to stabilise Williams, who dies shortly after. Forced to abandon his body, the four remaining escape on foot. After finding another shelter and while recovering from what has happened, Inkelaar is killed by a sniper while Frankie is wounded before a group of insurgents surrounds them. Frater leads the others into surrendering. After being captured, Michael and Frater are bound and forced to watch as Frankie bleeds to death in front of them. That night, Frater uses the distraction of an approaching creature to disarm and kill one of their guards, and the two of them escape on motorcycles, determined to finish their mission.

After the bikes run out of gas, they continue eastward until they encounter a destroyed school bus. As Frater searches for water, Michael encounters a boy still alive. They briefly debate euthanising him until they are rescued by locals, who feed them and give them water in gratitude for saving the boy's life. Michael wanders off with Ara, and they witness one of the creatures spreading luminescent spores through the night time desert around them, while Frater visits the boy who succumbs to his injuries. Frustrated at their failure to save the boy, Frater angrily reminds Michael of their mission, and the two continue east toward a settlement their men would have gone to. However, they discover there that the soldiers they were meant to rescue had all been killed prior to their arrival. Now enraged by the futility of their mission and the lives lost, Frater snaps and kills one of the villagers. Michael is forced to shoot him to keep him from killing the rest of the family.

Violent tremors prompt Frater to wander out of the village as Michael follows him to their extraction point. As an enormous creature emerges from the sands in front of them, Frater collapses and dies from his injury. The evac helicopter comes in and picks up Michael, who looks on in silence as the screen cuts to black.

Cast

Production

The film is the first feature to be directed by Green, who previously had directed episodes of the Channel 4 television programme Misfits. Green wrote the screenplay with Jay Basu and the two had free rein to make what type of movie they wanted as long as it included monsters. Taking inspiration from the military presence in the first film, the two decided to make a war film that explored what Green termed "socially relevant themes".  Gareth Edwards served as the film's executive producer, but the film's production ran concurrently with Edwards' own Godzilla, thus he could not contribute much to the actual film.

Release
Vertigo Films premiered the film in London on 9 October 2014 as part of the BFI London Film Festival.  Vertigo planned to release it in the United Kingdom on 28 November 2014 but delayed its release to 27 February 2015. The film was eventually released in the US on 17 April 2015 and in the UK on 1 May 2015.

Reception
The film received mostly negative reviews. It earned a 17% score based on 35 reviews on aggregator Rotten Tomatoes; the consensus is: "Monsters: Dark Continent lacks the fresh approach and thought-provoking subtext of its predecessor, settling instead for tired war movie clichés." Peter Bradshaw of The Guardian called it "uncompromisingly boring and pointless". Kim Newman of Empire awarded it four stars, remarking, "In its fantastical way, this is one of the most believable, pointed and sober films about the wars of the 21st century." Neil Smith of Total Film awarded the film three out of five stars and said, "Ambitiously staged and impressively shot, Monsters: Dark Continent makes a bold stab at mounting a franchise but lacks the vision and surprise of its predecessor."  Peter Debruge of Variety called it "a taxingly over-earnest war movie".

References

External links
 
 Monsters: Dark Continent at Twitter

2014 horror films
2014 independent films
2010s science fiction horror films
Alien invasions in films
British independent films
British science fiction horror films
Vertigo Films films
British sequel films
2010s English-language films
Films set in the Middle East
Films shot in Jordan
Films shot in Michigan
Giant monster films
2010s British films